Charruba or Kharruba is a village in Libya. It's linked with Timimi by the Charruba-Timimi desert road, and with Tacnis (to the North) by another road.

Populated places in Marj District
Cyrenaica